Bessay-sur-Allier (literally Bessay on Allier) is a commune in the Allier department in central France.

Population

Administration 
The current mayor is Didier Paqueriaud, elected in 2020.

See also 
Communes of the Allier department

External links 
 Town hall website

References 

Communes of Allier
Allier communes articles needing translation from French Wikipedia